Kishtwar is a town, municipality and administrative headquarter of the Kishtwar District in the Indian union territory of Jammu and Kashmir. The district was carved out of the Doda district in 2007. and is located in the Jammu division. A large ground locally called as Chowgan ground is located in the heart of the town. Kishtwar is bordered by the Anantnag and Doda districts in the west and northwest, by the Chamba district of Himachal Pradesh in the south and the Kargil district of Ladakh in the east and northeast.

In 2013 the municipality was the location the Kishtwar Riots, which claimed three lives and injured 80 more, and was a conflict between Muslim and Hindu communities that occurred in the aftermath of the Eid festival on 9 August 2013 at Kishtwar, Jammu and Kashmir.

Demographics

As of the 2011 Indian census, Kishtwar had a population of 14,865. Males constitute 63% of the population and females 37%. Kishtwar has an average literacy rate of 78%, higher than the Indian national average: male literacy is 82%, and female literacy is 42%. In Kishtwar, 11% of the population is under six years of age. The main language spoken here by Muslims is Kashmiri, while the Hindus of Kishtwar speak a Western Pahari language called Kishtwari. The dominant religion in Kishtwar is Islam, at 70.41% of the population, with Hinduism the second-largest religion, at 29.59%.

Transport

Air
Kishtwar does not have its own airport as 2023, although there is a helipad located just 3 km north of the city. The government has a project for a 1200–1300 airstrip in Kishtwar in upcoming years. The nearest airports to Kishtwar is Jammu Airport located 215km away.

Rail
There is no rail-connectivity to Kishtwar yet. The nearest railway station is Udhampur railway station, located at a distance of 150 kilometres.

Road
Kishtwar is well-connected by roads to other places in Jammu and Kashmir and rest of India, as several highways and roads pass through Kishtwar including NH 244.

References

Kishtwar district
Cities and towns in Kishtwar district